The 2012–13 Women's CEV Cup was the 41st edition of the European CEV Cup volleyball club tournament, the former Top Teams Cup.

Teams of the 2012–2013

Main phase

1/16 Finals
1st leg 23–25 October 2012
2nd leg 30–1 November 2012
The 16 winning teams from the 1/16 Finals will compete in the 1/8 Finals playing Home & Away
matches. 
The losers of the 1/16 Final matches will qualify for the 3rd round in Challenge Cup.

1/8 Finals
1st leg 13–15 November 2012
2nd leg 20–22 November 2012

1/4 Finals
1st leg 4–6 December 2012
2nd leg 11–13 December 2012

Challenge Phase
Teams from CEV Women's Champions League: 2004 Tomis Constanța, Bank BPS Fakro Muszyna, Tauron MKS Dabrowa Gornizca, Uralochka-NTMK Ekaterinburg
Teams from Main phase: Omichka Omsk Region, Aluprof Bielsko-Biala, Fenerbahçe, Ses Calais
1st leg 15–16 January 2013
2nd leg 22–23 January 2013

Final phase

Semi-finals
1st leg 6–7 February 2013
2nd leg 12–14 February 2013

Finals
1st leg 27 February 2013
2nd leg 2 March 2013

External links
 2012–13 Women's CEV Cup

2012-13
CEV Cup
CEV Cup